Pseudhapalopus is a monotypic genus of Bolivian tarantulas containing the single species, Pseudhapalopus aculeatus. It was first described by Embrik Strand in 1907, and is found in Bolivia.

See also
 List of Theraphosidae species

References

Monotypic Theraphosidae genera
Spiders of South America
Spiders of the Caribbean
Taxa named by Embrik Strand
Theraphosidae